"Blue Daisy" is the Brilliant Green's nineteenth single, released on June 30, 2010. It peaked at #20 on the Oricon Singles Chart.

Track listing

References

2010 singles
2010 songs
Songs written by Shunsaku Okuda
Songs written by Tomoko Kawase
The Brilliant Green songs
Warner Music Japan singles